State Road 3 (SR 3), known locally as North Courtenay Parkway, is a north–south road located entirely on Merritt Island, serving as the southern access for the Kennedy Space Center near Cape Canaveral, Florida.  The shortest of the one-digit Florida State Roads, its southern terminus is an intersection with SR 520 on Merritt Island, east of Cocoa.

Route description
SR 3, also known as North Courtenay Parkway, runs from SR 520 north through Merritt Island and into very rural areas before terminating at the Kennedy Space Center property line.

The Florida Department of Transportation annual average daily traffic (AADT) numbers for 2012 show an average of 26,000 vehicles just north of SR 520, increasing to 29,000 just south of SR 528/SR A1A, then decreasing to 25,500 just north of its crossing with those two roads, and further decreasing to 21,500, finally halving to 12,600 as the road approaches the turn to the north-east and its northern terminus.

History
Not one inch of the original alignment of SR 3 is in the current route.  Until the opening of the Emory L. Bennett Causeway in June 1956, the route to KSC was signed SR A1A as A1A was routed across the Banana River on the Merritt Island Causeway (SR 520) – and was, in fact, cosigned with SR 520 – and then northward along North Tropical Trail through Kennedy Space Center to an intersection with the former SR 402 (now County Road 402) near the shore of Mosquito Lagoon in the (present-day) Merritt Island National Wildlife Refuge near Titusville.

In the meantime, SR 3 extended along the length of Tropical Trail from US 1 near Oak Hill to the southern tip of Merritt Island, where it crosses the Banana River on the Mathers Bridge (a swing span drawbridge) before turning south on South Patrick Drive (present day SR 513) and crossing the Indian River back to the mainland on the Eau Gallie Causeway (present day SR 518) and terminating at U.S. Route 1 (SR 5) in Melbourne.  Between then-SR 402 and SR 520, SR 3 was cosigned with SR A1A.

The openings of the Emory L. Bennett Causeway and the Pineda Causeway in 1971 triggered a massive transformation of SR 3.  The former causeway shifted SR A1A to the north (to the newly extended Bee Line Expressway) as SR 3 was realigned to cover North Courtenay Parkway and provide the access to the Kennedy Space Center (the segment north of KSC lost its SR 3 and A1A signs); the latter causeway prompted the establishment of South Patrick Drive as the primary southern access to Patrick Space Force Base as SR 513.

In 1976, the Florida Department of Transportation added a "C-" prefix to the signs on the stretch south of SR 520 and started the transition from State Road 3 to County Road 3.

Courtenay Parkway eventually was extended past the SR 520 beyond the Merritt Island Airport to the historic community of Georgiana, where it meets up with the older South Tropical Trail, however this is a county facility and does not carry the state road designation.  The last phase was completed in the late 1980s.

Major intersections

References

External links

003
003
003
Merritt Island, Florida
1945 establishments in Florida